You Again? is an American sitcom television series that aired for two seasons on NBC from February 27, 1986, to January 7, 1987. It was based on the British show Home to Roost.

Synopsis
Jack Klugman stars as Henry Willows, a man still embittered from his divorce ten years earlier, who had made no effort to see his son Matt (John Stamos) during that time.  Henry had become fairly comfortable with his life as a supermarket manager and was not really looking to make major changes to it when Matt arrived looking to stay with his father, whom he hardly knew anymore.  Matt was an ill-mannered but quite attractive youth who was very popular with the girls.  He drove the gruff Henry almost over the edge, but of course in the end familial ties conquered all differences in sitcom tradition.

Cast

Main cast
 Jack Klugman as Henry Willows
 John Stamos as Matt Willows
 Elizabeth Bennett as Enid Thompkins
 Valerie Landsburg as Pam
 Barbara Rhoades as Maggie Davis

Guest cast
 The Beach Boys
 K Callan
 Conrad Janis
 Richard Kline
 Robert Morse
 Alan Oppenheimer
 Marion Ross
 Armin Shimerman
 Liz Torres
 David Wohl

Production

Development
The show was based on the British show Home to Roost, which was still in production at the same time. British actress Elizabeth Bennett played housekeeper "Enid Thompson" in the British version and "Enid Tompkins" in the US version simultaneously, so she was a frequent commuter from London to Los Angeles during the time in which You Again? was in production.

Episode list

Season 1 (1986)

Season 2 (1986–87)

Reception

Ratings
You Again? did not achieve the same level of hit status of Home to Roost in the UK, with many viewers finding it difficult to accept the 64-year-old Klugman as the father of 23-year-old Stamos. Nonetheless, the show finished at #19 in its first season's ratings, ahead of other, longer-running shows such as 227 and The Facts of Life and strong enough for NBC to renew it for a second season. It ran for just under a year, occupying four different time slots in the process, prior to its cancellation. Less than a year after You Again? went off the air, John Stamos began appearing on the long-running sitcom Full House.

References
Brooks, Tim and Marsh, Earle, The Complete Directory to Prime Time Network and Cable TV Shows

External links
 
 

1986 American television series debuts
1987 American television series endings
1980s American sitcoms
American television series based on British television series
English-language television shows
NBC original programming
Television series by CBS Studios
Television shows set in New York City